Alter Kahn und junge Liebe (English-language title: Old Barge, Young Love) is an East German (then GDR) romance film directed by Hans Heinrich. It was released in 1957.

Plot
Skipper Vollbeck leads a small group of barges traveling down the Havel from Berlin to Waren. To meet his debtors' demands, he loaded his ship with cement almost beyond its capability to carry. Horst, the skipper of one of the other boats, and Vollbeck's son Kalle both fall in love with the older skipper's niece Anna, who joined the journey. Eventually, she chooses Kalle and they marry, after the barges manage to make it to Waren.

Cast
 Alfred Maack as Heinrich Borchert
 Erika Dunkelmann as  Marie
 Götz George as  Karl 'Kalle'
 Gustav Püttjer as Herrmann Vollbeck
 Maria Häussler as  Anne Vollbeck
 Kurt Schmidtchen as Ernst
 Horst Naumann as Horst Richter
 Uwe Torsten as  Buttje
 Elfie Dugal as lady
 Waltraud Kogel as the assistant
 Alice Prill as secretary

Production
The film was one of the more light-hearted DEFA productions of the second half of the 1950s, created after a wave of highly ideological films were negatively received by the public. According to author Heinz Kersten, it had only "a modest saying on the matters of society" and was "entertainment". It was Götz George's first major role on the screen.

Reception
The West German Catholic Film Service described the film as "having several clumsy moments. Generally, an undemanding piece of entertainment." The World Stage newspaper's critic dubbed as "dramatically dull."

References

External links
 
Alter Kahn und junge Liebe on filmportal.de
Alter Kahn und junge Liebe original poster on ostfilm.de
Alter Kahn und junge Liebe on PROGRESS' website.
Alter Kahn und junge Liebe on DEFA Sternstunden.

1957 films
East German films
1950s German-language films
Films set in Berlin
1950s romance films
German romance films
German black-and-white films
Seafaring films
1950s German films